Marvin McQuitty (August 30, 1966 – September 11, 2012) was an American gospel drummer. He played with a range of gospel artists including Fred Hammond, Israel & New Breed, Kirk Franklin and Mary Mary but also worked with pop artists like Stevie Wonder, Jessica Simpson and Destiny's Child.

McQuitty grew up in Ann Arbor, Michigan. He married Kimberly McQuitty in 1988 and had two daughters, Marielle and Simone. He died in 2012 after a 5-year struggle with the blood disorder autoimmune myelofibrosis.

In 2013 he was posthumously awarded the first ever BMI Lifetime Achievement Award.

References

External links
 Marvin McQuitty Jr.: The Rhythm of Life, a movie about his life
 
 In Honor of Marvin McQuitty, Hudson Music

American drummers
1966 births
2012 deaths
Musicians from Ann Arbor, Michigan